KCNR (1460 AM) is a radio station broadcasting a Talk Radio format.
KCNR is "Radio for The People by The People". It emphasizes the importance of community focused radio, as opposed to corporately directed content.  Licensed to Shasta, California, United States, it serves the Redding area.  The station is now owned by Free Fire Media.

Translators
KCNR broadcasts on the following translator:

External links
KMCA Website (no longer exists)

CNR
Radio stations established in 1967
1967 establishments in California